Forum Groningen is a cultural center in the city of Groningen in the northern Netherlands that houses a library, cinema, and parts of the Groninger Museum. Forum Groningen opened in November 2019, and is expected to receive 1.6 million visitors annually.

The center is located next to the Great Market Square and the New Market and is part of larger reconstruction plans of the Great Market Square's eastern side.

History

Planning 
The eastern side of Groningen's Great Market Square was destroyed in World War II. It has subsequently been rebuilt, but its facade has since lost appeal. Municipal authorities initiated plans for its redevelopment in 2005, but met heavy opposition from the city council. A plebiscite was held on 29 June, inviting inhabitants to weigh in. Although 53% of the votes were favorable, results were voided due to a turnout of only 38.5%.

Architects were invited to enter an architectural design competition, allowing the city's inhabitants to put together a top three out of a total of seven designs, from which the Forum's winning design was chosen by a municipal council.

Construction 
Construction costs were projected to be around 71 million, of which €35 million was paid by the provincial government. Provincial authorities attempted to back out of the project in 2010; threats of legal action led by Jan Terlouw secured its renewed support.
Work to demolish the site's original development—a shopping center and a student association building—began in September 2011. The building was slated for completion in 2017, allowing for six years' of construction. However, decades' worth of large-scale drilling in the Groningen gas field has led to an increase in induced earthquakes in the province, whose event count shows an exponential growth in time, and caused a budget overrun and construction to run overdue for two years, as new plans had to be drafted to ensure the building's earthquake-resistance.

The building had its official opening on 29 November 2019.

References

External links 

 
 

2019 establishments in the Netherlands
Buildings and structures completed in 2019
Buildings and structures in Groningen (city)
Cinemas and movie theaters in the Netherlands
Cultural centers in the Netherlands
Event venues established in 2019
Museums in Groningen (province)
Public libraries in the Netherlands
21st-century architecture in the Netherlands